Grant Lewis (born January 20, 1985) is an American former professional ice hockey defenseman.

Early life
Lewis, who is Jewish, was born in Pittsburgh. He attended Upper St. Clair High School. Upon the completion of his professional playing career in 2016, Lewis set his sights on pursuing a professional career in dentistry. He is currently on track to receive a DDS degree.

Playing career
Lewis was drafted 40th overall in the 2004 NHL Entry Draft by the Atlanta Thrashers. He played collegiate hockey with Dartmouth College of the ECAC. During his freshman season he had 25 points, including 3 goals, in 34 games. His 25 points was the second-highest for a freshman in the history of the college. In four seasons he played in 120 games, and had 13 goals and 64 assists for 77 points.

Grant was signed by the Thrashers to a three-year entry level contract on July 6, 2007.

Lewis made his professional debut in the 2007–08 season with the Thrashers affiliate, the Chicago Wolves of the AHL. He played in 43 games with the Wolves, helping the Wolves capture the Calder Cup. In the 2008–09 season, Lewis was recalled by the Thrashers on March 2, 2009. He made his NHL debut for the Thrashers on March 3, 2009, in a 4–3 loss against the Florida Panthers.

Grant played in 26 games with the Wolves in the 2009–10 season, before he was reassigned, by the Thrashers, to the Hershey Bears on March 10, 2010. Used as a depth defenseman, Grant played in one playoff game with the Bears as they successfully defended the Calder Cup.

On September 1, 2010, Grant was traded prior to the 2010–11 season by the Thrashers to the Nashville Predators for Ian McKenzie.

After the 2010–11 season with the Milwaukee Admirals, Grant left for Europe and experienced a one-year tenure in the Russian Kontinental Hockey League with Lev Poprad.

Lewis spent the duration of the 2012–13 season, with the Straubing Tigers of the German DEL.  On June 3, 2013, Lewis remained in Germany, transferring to EHC München on a one-year contract.

Career statistics

Awards and honors

See also
List of players who played only one game in the NHL
List of select Jewish ice hockey players

References

External links

1985 births
Living people
American men's ice hockey defensemen
Atlanta Thrashers draft picks
Atlanta Thrashers players
Chicago Wolves players
Dartmouth Big Green men's ice hockey players
EHC Black Wings Linz players
EHC München players
Hershey Bears players
HC Lev Poprad players
Ice hockey players from Pennsylvania
Jewish American sportspeople
Jewish ice hockey players
Milwaukee Admirals players
People from Allegheny County, Pennsylvania
Straubing Tigers players
21st-century American Jews
American expatriate ice hockey players in Slovakia
American expatriate ice hockey players in Germany
American expatriate ice hockey players in Austria